The World University Baseball Championship is an under-23 international college baseball competition sponsored by the International University Sports Federation (FISU) and was first held in 2002 in Italy. Until 2013, it was sanctioned by the then-International Baseball Federation (IBAF) and was one of several tournaments considered by the IBAF to be a minor world championship, and as such the results of the tournaments affected the IBAF World Rankings. For its men's world rankings, the World Baseball Softball Confederation (WBSC) -- successor to the IBAF—now uses the results of WBSC's biennial 23U Baseball World Cup (instead of the World University Championship).

History 
The fifth World University Baseball Championship was held from July 29 to August 8, 2010 in Tokyo, Japan and was organized by the All Japan University Baseball Federation.

Results

Medal table

See also
Baseball awards
Baseball at the Summer Universiade
U-23 Baseball World Cup

References

External links 
FISU Baseball World University Championships

 
International baseball competitions
Baseball
Recurring sporting events established in 2002